Oliver Jennings may refer to:
Oliver Burr Jennings, Standard Oil businessman
Oliver Gould Jennings, son of the Standard Oil businessman

See also
Oliver Gould Jennings House